Vidyabhushana (1952-) is a vocalist from Karnataka. He sings devotional songs, chiefly Haridasa compositions,  and carnatic classical music. He has many albums to his credit, mainly devotional songs in Kannada, Tulu and has given concerts all over the world. His first album was titled "Dasara Padagalu" and the 100th titled "Tanu Ninnadu Jivana Ninnadu". Performing for more than 40 years, he has traveled to many countries including a tour across the United States in 1999., He was honoured with the title of Sangeetha Vidya Nidhi in 1994. He was also honoured the Doctorate by Hampi University.

Vidyabhushana began to learn music when he was young, from his father Govindacharya, and for several years was a student of B. V. Narayana Aithal of Udupi. In the later years he got training from the musician, Sangeetha Kalanidhi R. K. Srikantan and then from T. V. Gopalakrishnan of Chennai.

He continues his activities in music, and the spread of devotion and service to the community through "Bhakti Bharathi Prathistana", a trust for which he is the founder trustee. This trust conducts musical programs to commemorate Purandara Dasara Aradhana and other events. Presently he is constructing "Purandarashrama" in Bangalore.
He has written an auto biography on his life - "Nenape Sangeeta".
He is a native of Dakshina Kannada district. He lives with his wife Rama and two children in Bangalore. He was the pontiff of Subrahmanya Matha, before becoming a full-time singer. In 1997 he decided to give up the sanyasa and entered into wedlock.

Discography

 Abhayagirivasa srinivasa
 Alli Ganapa Illi Ganapa
 Ambiga naa ninna nambide
 Ambike jagadambike
 Anegudda Shri Vinayaka
 Annamayya keertanegalu
 Archana
 Arpana
 Baaro krishnayya
 Baaro Muddu Krishna- Cheluva hayavadana
 Banda krishna chandadinda(Kallu sakkare kolliro)
 Bande Gururaya
 Bhagavad Gita – Sanskrit/Kannada
 Bhagavatamruta
 Bhagyada lakshmi baaramma
 Bhajan Vidya
 Bhajeyham Kumaram-Sanskrit
 Bhakthi kusumanjalai- teertakshetra
 Bhakthi sudha
 BhakthiSowrabha
 Bhasuta banda nodi
 Brahma Sutrani
 Chinte yaake maduti
 Classical-Vocal
 Daariyavudayya
 Daasa Tharangini 
 Daasaamrutha-Sri-Vidyabhushana
 Daasara padagalu- Classical
 Dasara Padagalu – jaya janaki kantha (Nivedana)
 Dayamado Ranga
 Dayasagara
 Dayavirali damodara
 Devaki Nandana
 Devi
 Dharma rakshaka deva manjunatha
 Dhayanidhe
 Dwadasha_Stotra – Kannada -1
 Dwadasha_Stotra – Kannada -2
 Dwadasha_Stotra_1
 Dwadasha_Stotra_2
 Ee pariya sobagu
 Eetaneega nammadevanu
 Elli Nodidharalli Raama 
 Enna Paaliso karunaakara 
 Entha-Punya-Entha-Bhagya(karevaru baa krishna)
 Enu Dhanyalo Lakumi
 Estu Sahasavanta
 Ethanega Vasudeva
 Geetha Sanskritam
 Geethamrutham
 Girija Tanaya Gajanana
 Gita Govinda
 Gopakumarashtaka
 Gopi-Geetham
 Govinda Bhajane Sukhavayya 
 Govinda Smaranam
 Govindanama-Vedavyasa_Prarthana 
 Guru Madhwamuniraya
 Guru Purandara Daasare
 Haalu Maaralu Podevamma
Haripunyanama
 Hari bhajane mado
 Hari Kunida
 Hari Naarayana (Vidhyabhushan)
 Hari Smarane (Classical)
 Haridaasara Sanga Ninayya 
 Haridasa Namana(Shiva)
 Haridasapadagalu-Vidyabhushana
 Haridasara Ugabhoga Chintana
 HaridasaruKandaShiva
 Haridasaru-Kanda-Sri-Krishna(jaya jaya hayavadana)
 Harikathamrutasara
 Harikathamruthasara_1
 Harikathamruthasara_2
 Hariye sri Hariye (Live concert)
 Hattiangadi
 Ille-Vaikunta-Kaaniro
 Indu enage govinda
 Indu Kande Charana
 Innu dayabarade
 Ishtu Dina Vaikuntha- Kanakadasara padagalu
 jagadoddarana
 Jaganmohanane krishna
 Jaya Jaya Hayavadana
 Jayajaya Raghavendra
 Jojo Lali Krishna
 Kande karunanidhiya
 Kandu Dhanyanade
 Karnatic Classical Vocal
 Kayo karunakara
 Keertahan kaveri
 Kolu-Kolenna-Kole
 Krishna
 Krishna Nee Begane Baaro
 Krishna-Manohara
 Krishnana kandira
 Krishne krupe mado
 Kukke Subrahmanya
 Kunidado Krishna
 Lakshmi Shobane
 Lakshmi_Saraswathi
 Maatanadai Krishna
 Maneyolagado govinda
 Mangalashtakam
 Manninda Kaaya Manninda
 Meditation-SriVidyabhushana
 Muddu krishna
 Mukhyaprana
 Muralidhara Krishna
 MuraliManohara
 Nagumomu
 Naguvarallo Ranga 
 Nambu Narayanana
 Nammama kollura Mookambike
 Nammama Sharade
 Namo Venkatesha
 Narasimha_Stotravali
 Narayana Ninna Nama
 Navagraha bhakti geethe
 Navagraha_stotra
 Neene Anaatha Bandhu
 Nimma bhagya doddadu
 Nitya Ashtothara
 Nitya Stotra
 Nodide Gurugala
 Noorentu narayana
 Om Gam ganapataye namah
 Onde Manadi Bhajisu
 Paahi Lakshmi Narasimha
 Paramaatma-Sri-Vidyabhushana
 Pavamana Pavamana
 Popu Hogona(haridasara sanga neenayya)
 Pratah Sankalpa Gadya
 Protective mantras
 Purandara Daasara Padagalu
 Rama Raksha Stotra
 Rama Rama Enniro
 Ranga baaro
 Ranga banda manege
 Sacred-Chants-Vidyahushana
 Sadachara Smriti
 Satyanarayana vrata- Kapadu deva satyanarayana
 Sharanu Venkatanatha - Paaliso Venkata Giriraya
 Shiva Stuti-SriVidyabhushana
 Shree Rama Raksha Stotram
 Shri Madbhagavadgitha - puttige - Gita Mandir
 SHRI SUMADHWA VIJAYA
 Smarisibadukiro (Aaraadhana)
 Smarisidavarannu-Kayva-Sri-Vidyabhushana
 Sri Annapoorneshwari suprahbhata
 Sri Dhanwantri Stotra
 Sri Krishna Bhakthi Geethanjali
 Sri Lakshminarasimha Suprahbatam-Kannada
 Sri Mahalakshmi
 Sri Narasimha Suprahbhatam-Sanskrit
 Sri Ramanjaneya
 Sri Shanaischara
 Sri Venkatesha Suprabhatham
 Sri Vinayaka
 Sri Vishnu Sahasranaama
 Sri-Cheluvaraya
 Sri Ganapathi(Sanskrit)
 Sri GanapathiSahasranamavali
 Sri GuruRaghavendra Sthotramala-
 Sri Raghavendra Sahasranama
 Sri Raghavendra Vijaya-Mahakavyam
 Sri Raghavendra Guru Dasha Stotra
 Stotra Sangraha
 Stuti Panchakam
 Sundarakaanda-1 (Kannada)
 Sundarakaanda-2 (Kannada)
 Sundaramooruti Mukhyaprana(Manava janma doddadu)
 Tamboori meetidava
 Tanu ninnadu jeevana
 Tulu devotional songs on krishna
 Tulu Geethegalu
 Udara Vairagya
 Udayaraga-1
 Udayaraga-2 (Govinda Enni)
 Udupi-Krishna
 Ughabhoga-1
 Ughabhoga-2
 Ughabhoga-3
 Ughabhoga-4
 Unknown_Venkata_Album
 Vadirajaru
 Veni-Madhava
 Venkatachala Nilayam
 Venkataramanane baaro
 Vitallayya Vitallayya
 Sri Hanuman- Sanskrit
 Raaga raagini
 Tirtha Prabhanda
 Guru Jagannatha dasara kruthigalu
 Hari punya nama - Kaiwara yogi narayana keertanegalu
 Sri Lakshminarayana Hrudaya samputa -  Guru Jagannatha dasaru
 Hanuma narasimha
 Sri Devi Divya darshana
 Marete eno ranga
 Vittalla salaho swamy
 Shree Vadiraajara Drudha Rijugalendhodi
 Krupa Saagari
 Sri Bhramarambika Pooja Vaibhava
 Poo Parnd | Tulu Songs
 Poo Poojane | Tulu Devotional Songs

References

External links 
'Singing for the saints', Article in a leading Indian daily, 'The Hindu', dated 28 October 2005
ISKCON Festivals
udgeetha.com
Shri Vidyabhushana fan club list

Male Carnatic singers
Carnatic singers
Mangaloreans
Tulu people
Living people
Singers from Karnataka
Recipients of the Rajyotsava Award 2005
1952 births